The 2006–07 English Hockey League season took place from September 2006 until April 2007. The league was sponsored by Slazenger and the men's title was won by Reading with the women's title going to Leicester. There were no playoffs during the season.

The Men's Cup was won by Cannock and the Women's Cup was won by Bowdon Hightown.

Men's Slazenger Premier Division League Standings 

One point deducted*

Results

Women's Slazenger Premier Division League Standings

Men's Cup

Quarter-finals

Semi-finals

Final 
(Held at the Reading on 1 April)

Women's Cup

Quarter-finals

Semi-finals

Final 
(Held at Reading on 1 April)

References 

England Hockey League seasons
field hockey
field hockey
England